The 2002–03 Red Stripe Bowl was the 29th edition of what is now the Regional Super50, the domestic limited-overs cricket competition for the countries of the West Indies Cricket Board (WICB). It ran from 14 August to 1 September 2002, with matches played in Jamaica and Saint Lucia.

Ten teams contested the competition, including several first-time participants. For a second consecutive season, the Leeward and Windward Islands teams were each broken up into two teams – Antigua and Barbuda and Saint Vincent and the Grenadines entered separate teams, with players from the remaining countries playing for "Rest of Leeward Islands" and "Rest of Windward Islands" teams. A University of the West Indies team entered for the first time, while Canada were invited as a guest team. The semi-finals and final of the competition were all held in Discovery Bay, Jamaica, with Barbados eventually defeating Jamaica in the final to win their fifth domestic one-day title (and first since the 1987–88 season). Barbadian batsman Floyd Reifer led the tournament in runs, while Merv Dillon of Trinidad and Tobago and Daren Powell of Jamaica were the equal leading wicket-takers.

Squads

Group stage

Zone A

Zone B

Finals

Semi-finals

Final

Statistics

Most runs
The top five run scorers (total runs) are included in this table.

Source: CricketArchive

Most wickets

The top five wicket takers are listed in this table, listed by wickets taken and then by bowling average.

Source: CricketArchive

References

2002 in West Indian cricket
West Indian cricket seasons from 2000–01
Regional Super50 seasons
Domestic cricket competitions in 2002–03